The Accounting is a 1958 novel by Scottish writer Bruce Marshall, published as The Bank Audit in the UK.

Plot summary
The scene of this novel is Paris, where the branch of a well-known London bank is being audited. A normally routine affair, this year's audit is different—the auditors have reason to believe that there may be fraud or embezzlement at play.

How do the auditors know this?  A few indiscreet words overheard at a Paris nightclub.

Our attention is turned to each player, some major and many minor, the bank officials and overseers of the audit of course, but mostly to the underpaid, unhappy junior and senior auditors, each a prisoner of his own private conflicts and aspirations, and each seeing the discovery and proving of the fraud as his chance for promotion.

The novel makes the seemingly boring task of auditing understandable and delves into the hearts of those who make business their life's work.

References

Novels by Bruce Marshall
1958 British novels
Scottish novels
Novels set in Paris
Constable & Co. books